The following is a list of notable people who were born in Como, Italy.

Pliny the Elder (Gaius Plinius Secundus; 23–79 CE), author, natural philosopher and naval and military commander known for the Naturalis Historia
Caecilius (c. 59 CE), a poet, the subject of Catullus's Carmina 35, who had a girlfriend more learned than the Sapphic Muse
Pliny the Younger (Gaius Plinius Caecilius Secundus; 63–c.113 CE), lawyer, an author and a natural philosopher of Ancient Rome
Agostina Camozzi (1435–1458), Roman Catholic professed religious from the Order of Saint Augustine beatified by Pope Gregory XVI on 19 September 1834
Paolo Giovio (1483–1552), physician, historian and biographer remembered as a chronicler of the Italian Wars
Benedetto Odescalchi (1611–1689), Pope Innocent XI from 1676 until his death
Alessandro Volta (1745–1827), physicist known for the development of the battery in 1800
Luigi Borgomainerio (1836–1876), caricaturist
Cosima Liszt (1837–1930), Franz Liszt's daughter and Richard Wagner's wife
Maria Roda (1877–?), Italian American anarchist-feminist 
Giuseppe Sinigaglia (1884-1916), rower, European championship gold medalist in 1911
Antonio Sant'Elia (1888–1916), architect
Mario Radice (1898–1987), abstract painter
Manlio Rho (1901–1957), abstract painter
Carla Porta Musa (1902–2012), essayist, poet and unverified supercentenarian
Giuseppe Terragni (1904–1943), an architect and pioneer of the Italian modern movement and rationalism
Giorgio Perlasca (1910–1992), saved 5,218 Jews from transportation to Nazi Germany and the Holocaust
Antonio Spallino (1925–2017), Olympic fencer and mayor of Como from 1970 to 1985
Gabriele Oriali (born 1952), 1982 Italian national team footballer World Champion
Corrado Passera (born 1954), manager and banker, Minister of Economic Development of the Monti Cabinet
Stefano Casiraghi (1960–1990), World Offshore Champion and second husband of Caroline Princess of Monaco
Max Papis (born 1969), Formula One, Champ Car, and NASCAR racing driver
Luisa Lambri (1969), artist, photographer, filmmaker
Fabio Casartelli (1970–1995) cyclist and Olympic gold medalist
Diego De Ascentis (born 1976), football midfielder
Paola Tagliabue (born 1976), world champion free diver in 2006
Gianluca Zambrotta (born 1977), international footballer and World Champion in Germany 2006
Jennifer Isacco (born 1977), bobsledder, Olympic medallist in 2006
Floraleda Sacchi (born 1978), harpist and musicologist
Anna Cappellini (born 1987), ice dancer, olympian, two times national champion, European champion and world champion in 2014
Francesca Rio (born 1990), figure skater, junior national champion and three-time national silver medallist
Matteo Bianchetti (born 1993), captain of the Italian national under-21 football team
Filippo Mondelli (1994–2021), world champion rower
Elisa Meneghini (born 1997), olympian, artistic gymnast, gold medalist at the 2018 Doha World Cup
Patrick Cutrone (born 1998), footballer striker of AC Milan

References